THJ-018 (SGT-17) is a synthetic cannabinoid that is the indazole analogue of JWH-018 and has been sold online as a designer drug.

Pharmacology
THJ-018 acts as a full agonist with a binding affinity of 5.84 nM at CB1 and 4.57 nM at CB2 cannabinoid receptors.

Legality
THJ-018 is an Anlage II controlled drug in Germany. It is also banned in Sweden.

See also 
 THJ-2201
 AM-2201

References 

Cannabinoids
Designer drugs
Naphthoylindazoles